Gerhard Hoffmann (6 November 1919 – 11 April 1945) was a German Luftwaffe military aviator during World War II, a fighter ace credited with 130 aerial victories—that is, 130 aerial combat encounters resulting in the destruction of the enemy aircraft—claimed in an unknown number of combat missions.

Born in Nieden, Hoffmann was trained as a fighter pilot and was posted to Jagdgeschwader 52 (JG 52—52nd Fighter Wing) in 1942. Fighting on the Eastern Front, he claimed his first aerial victory on 26 October 1942 and his 100th aerial victory on March/April 1944. On 14 May 1944, Hoffmann was awarded the Knight's Cross of the Iron Cross, the highest award in the military and paramilitary forces of Nazi Germany during World War II. He then served as an instructor with Ergänzungs-Jagdgruppe West, a supplementary fighter pilot training unit. On 10 April 1945, he was appointed Staffelkapitän (squadron leader) of 11. Staffel (11th squadron) of JG 52. The following day, Hoffmann was killed in a flight accident near Breslau.

Career
Hoffmann was born on 6 November 1919 in Nieden, present-day part of Ruciane-Nida in Poland, at the time in the Free State of Prussia of the Weimar Republic. Nicknamed "Fakken", he joined the military service of the Luftwaffe and following flight training in June 1942, was transferred to the 4. Staffel (4th squadron) of Jagdgeschwader 52 (JG 52—52nd Fighter Wing) on the Eastern Front. At the time, 4. Staffel was commanded by Oberleutnant Gerhard Barkhorn. The Staffel was subordinated to II. Gruppe (2nd group) headed by Hauptmann Johannes Steinhoff.

War against the Soviet Union
World War II in Europe had begun on Friday 1 September 1939 when German forces invaded Poland. Germany had launched Operation Barbarossa, the invasion of the Soviet Union on 22 June 1941. A year later, German forces launched Operation Fridericus II, the attack on Kupiansk, a preliminary operation to Case Blue, the strategic 1942 summer offensive in southern Russia. On 28 June, the 2nd and 4th Panzer Army began their advance towards the strategically important city of Voronezh on the Don river. The Battle of Voronezh marked the beginning of the German advance towards Stalingrad. By 21 September, II. Gruppe had made several relocations was then based at Maykop located in the North Caucasus. On 24 October, the Gruppe reached an airfield named Soldatskaja located approximately halfway between Mozdok and Pyatigorsk. Flying from this airfield, Hoffmann claimed his first aerial victory on 26 October when he shot down a Lavochkin-Gorbunov-Gudkov LaGG-3 fighter.

On 19 November, Soviet forces launched Operation Uranus which led to the encirclement of Axis forces in the vicinity of Stalingrad. To support the German forces fighting in Stalingrad, II. Gruppe was moved to an airfield at Morozovsk on 26 November. On 30 December, the Gruppe was ordered to an airfield at Gigant, retreating from the advancing Soviet forces. There, the unit flew ground missions against the Soviet infantry as well as fighter escort missions for Luftwaffe Junkers Ju 87 dive bombers. On 22 January 1943, II. Gruppe had to retreat further and moved to an airfield at Rostov-on-Don. Operating from Rostov, Hoffmann claimed an aerial victory of Lavochkin La-5 fighter on 25 January.

Kuban bridgehead

The Gruppe was moved to the combat area of the Kuban bridgehead on 10 February 1943 where it was initially based at an airfield at Slavyansk-na-Kubani. Due to whether conditions, II. Gruppe then moved to Kerch on 16 February. There, Hoffmann claimed a Polikarpov R-5 shot down on 28 February. On 3 March, he was credited with destruction of a Yakovlev Yak-1 fighter followed by a LaGG-3 fighter on two days later. On 13 March, the Gruppe moved to Anapa located on the northern coast of the Black Sea near the Sea of Azov and was fighting in the Battle of the Caucasus. According to Barbas, Hoffmann had increased his total number of aerial victories claimed to sixteen by the end of April 1943. While authors Prien, Stemmer, Rodeike and Bock, as well as authors Mathews and Foreman, list him with a total of 15 aerial victories in that timeframe. The discrepancies stem from aerial combat on 20 April. According to Barbas, Hoffmann shot down two Yak-1 fighters and a LaGG-3 fighter. The other authors list him with just two victories claimed that day, one Yak-1 fighter and one LaGG-3 fighter. By end of June, depending on source, his number of aerial victories increased to 26 or 25 respectively.

On 5 July, elements of II. On 1 August 1943, Oberleutnant Heinrich Sturm succeeded Barkhorn as commander of 4. Staffel while Barkhorn was given command of II. Gruppe of JG 52. Again depending on source, Hoffmann increased his aerial victories to either 31 or to 30 by the end of August. On 27 August, II. Here, the Gruppe fought at Izium and Kharkov, providing fighter escort for Ju 87 dive bombers, Junkers Ju 88 and Heinkel He 111 bombers, and Henschel Hs 129 ground-attack aircraft. On 18 September, II. Gruppe moved again, then operating from an airfield south of Kiev. In September, Hoffmann's number of aerial victories stood at 43 claimed. He was wounded, grounding him for some time.

Crimea

During his convalescence period, Hoffmann was awarded the German Cross in Gold on 12 December. He then returned to 4. Staffel of JG 52 and claimed his 43rd/44th—depening on source—aerial victory on 7 February 1944 over a Bell P-39 Airacobra fighter aircraft near Kerch. According to Obermaier, he claimed his 100th aerial victory on 16 March 1944 over the Crimea, which would make him the 65th Luftwaffe pilot to achieve the century mark. According to Barbas, as well as Mathews and Foreman, Hoffmann claimed his 100th aerial victory on 22 April 1944. On 8 April, Soviet forces had launched the Crimean offensive, forcing the Germans to evacuate the Crimea. On the first day of the operation, Hoffmann became an "ace-in-a-day" for the first time, claiming four Ilyushin Il-2 ground-attack aircraft and a Yak-1 fighter. The following day, he again claimed five aerial victories, making him and "ace-in-day" for the second time. On 17 and 18 April, Hoffmann claimed five and six aerial victories near Sevastopol, making him a four-time "ace-in-day". On 4 May 1944, 15 Bf 109s from II. Gruppe intercepted 24 Il-2 ground-attack aircraft from 8 GShAP (8th Guards Ground-attack Aviation Regiment) and 47 GShAP (47th Ground-attack Aviation Regiment), escorted by 23 fighter aircraft, over the Black Sea. In this encounter, pilots from II. Gruppe claimed six aerial victories, including two Il-2s by Hoffmann, without sustaining any losses. However, Soviet records only document the loss of three Il-2s and one Yakovlev Yak-9 fighter.

He once more became an "ace-in-day" on 7 May, taking his total to 121 aerial victories claimed, making him a five-time "ace-in-day". For these achievements, Hoffmann was awarded the Knight's Cross of the Iron Cross on 14 May 1944 for 125 aerial victories claimed. While 4. Staffel was withdrawn from the Eastern Front and subordinated to Jagdgeschwader 3 "Udet" (JG 3—3rd Fighter Wing) fighting on the Western Front, Hoffmann was transferred to the Ergänzungs-Jagdgruppe West, a supplementary fighter pilot training unit, in May 1944. There, he served as a fighter pilot instructor and was promoted to Leutnant (second lieutenant).

Squadron leader and death
Hoffmann was appointed Staffelkapitän (squadron leader) of the 4. Staffel of Ergänzungs-Jagdgeschwader 1 (EJG 1—1st Supplementary Fighter Wing), a Luftwaffe replacement training unit, on 1 November 1944. According to Obermaier, he claimed four aerial victories in March 1945 at the Oder while serving with EJG 1. Mathews and Foreman only list two aerial victories over Yakovlev Yak-3 fighters claimed on 8 March. In March/April 1945, EJG 1 was disbanded and its pilots were assigned to other Jagdgeschwader.

On 10 April, Hoffmann was made Staffelkapitän of the 11. Staffel of JG 52. He succeeded Oberleutnant Ludwig Neuböck who was transferred. The Staffel was subordinated to III. Gruppe of JG 52 and was headed by Major Adolf Borchers. The Gruppe had been based at Schweidnitz, present-day Świdnica in south-western Poland, since 16 March 1945. Hoffmann claimed his only aerial victory with 11. Staffel on 10 April when he shot down a P-39 fighter. The following day, he shuttled Bf 109 G-14 (Werknummer 785937) to Breslau, present-day Wrocław in southwestern Poland. On that flight, he collided with his wingman, Unteroffizier Richard Geiger, both pilots died in the accident.

Summary of career

Aerial victory claims
According to US historian David T. Zabecki, Hoffmann was credited with 130 aerial victories. Obermaier also lists Hoffmann with 130 aerial victories claimed in an unknown number of combat missions. He was also credited with the destruction of 128 vehicles of all types flying ground support missions. According to Spick, his total of aerial victories was 125 all of which claimed on the Eastern Front. Mathews and Foreman, authors of Luftwaffe Aces — Biographies and Victory Claims, researched the German Federal Archives and found records for 130 aerial victory claims recorded on the Eastern Front.

Victory claims were logged to a map-reference (PQ = Planquadrat), for example "PQ 43661". These sectors were then subdivided into 36 smaller units to give a location area 3 × 4 km in size.

Awards
 German Cross in Gold on 12 December 1943 as Feldwebel in the 4./Jagdgeschwader 52
 Honor Goblet of the Luftwaffe on 28 February 1944 as Feldwebel and pilot
 Knight's Cross of the Iron Cross on 14 May 1944 as pilot and Fahnenjunker-Feldwebel in the 4./Jagdgeschwader 52

Notes

References

Citations

Bibliography

External links

1919 births
1945 deaths
Luftwaffe pilots
German World War II flying aces
Luftwaffe personnel killed in World War II
Recipients of the Gold German Cross
Recipients of the Knight's Cross of the Iron Cross
People from East Prussia
People from Pisz County
Aviators killed in aviation accidents or incidents in Germany